Cochylimorpha perfusana is a species of moth of the family Tortricidae. It is found in France, Austria, Switzerland, Italy, Slovenia, Croatia, Hungary and Romania, as well as on Corsica.

The wingspan is 18–23 mm. Adults have been recorded on wing from May to September.

The larvae feed on Centaurea stoebe and Centaurea triumfetti. Larvae can be found in June.

References

Moths described in 1845
Cochylimorpha
Moths of Europe